Ravidas or Raidas was an Indian mystic poet-saint of the Bhakti movement during the 15th to 16th century CE. Venerated as a guru (teacher) in the modern regions of Uttar Pradesh, Bihar, Rajasthan, Gujarat, Maharashtra, Madhya Pradesh, Punjab, and Haryana, he was a poet, social reformer and spiritual figure.

The life details of Ravidas are uncertain and contested. Scholars believe he was born in 1433 CE.  He taught removal of social divisions of caste and gender, and promoted unity in the pursuit of personal spiritual freedom. 

Ravidas's devotional verses were included in the Sikh scriptures known as Guru Granth Sahib. The Panch Vani text of the Dadu Panthi tradition within Hinduism also includes numerous poems of Ravidas. He is also the central figure within the Ravidassia religious movement.

Life 
The details of Guru Ravidas's life are not well known. Scholars state he was born in 1377 CE and died in 1528 CE in Banaras at the age of 151 years.

Ravidas was born in the village of Sir Gobardhanpur, near Varanasi in what is now Uttar Pradesh, India. His birthplace is now known as Shri Guru Ravidass Janam Asthan. His birthday is celebrated as Ravidas Jayanti and important temple is Ravidas Temple. Mata Kalsi was his mother, and his father was Santokh Dass. His parents belonged to a leather-working Chamar community, an untouchable caste. While his original occupation was leather work, he began to spend most of his time in spiritual pursuits at the banks of the Ganges. Thereafter he spent most of his life in the company of Sufi saints, sadhus and ascetics. At the age of 12, Ravidas was married of to Lona Devi. They had a son, Vijay Dass.

The text Anantadas Parcai is one of the earliest surviving biographies of various Bhakti movement poets which describes the birth of Ravidas.

Medieval era texts, such as the Bhaktamal suggest that Ravidas was the disciple of the Brahmin bhakti-poet Ramananda. He is traditionally considered as Kabir's younger contemporary.

However, the medieval text Ratnavali says Ravidas gained his spiritual knowledge from Ramananda and was a follower of the Ramanandi Sampradaya tradition.

His ideas and fame grew over his lifetime, and texts suggest Brahmins used to bow before him. He travelled extensively, visiting Hindu pilgrimage sites in Andhra Pradesh, Maharashtra, Gujarat, Rajasthan, and those in the Himalayas. He abandoned saguna (with attributes, image) forms of supreme beings, and focused on the nirguna (without attributes, abstract) form of supreme beings. As his poetic hymns in regional languages inspired others, people from various background sought his teachings and guidance.

Most scholars believe that Ravidas met Guru Nanak, the founder of Sikhism. He is revered in the Sikh scripture, and 41 of Guru Ravidas' poems are included in the Adi Granth. These poems are one of the oldest attested source of his ideas and literary works. Another substantial source of legends and stories about the life of Ravidas is the hagiography in the Sikh tradition, the Premambodha. This text, composed over 170 years after Ravidas' death, in 1693, includes him as one of the seventeen saints of Indian religious tradition. The 17th-century Nabhadas's Bhaktamal, and the Parcais of Anantadas, both contain chapters on Ravidas. Other than these, the scriptures and texts of Sikh tradition and the Hindu Dadupanthi traditions, most other written sources about the life of Ravidas, including by the Ravidasi (followers of Ravidas), were composed in the early 20th century, or about 400 years after his death.

 This text, called the Parcaīs (or Parchais), included Ravidas among the sants whose biography and poems were included. Over time new manuscripts of Parcais of Anantadas were reproduced, some in different local languages of India. Winnand Callewaert notes that some 30 manuscripts of Anantadas's hagiography on Ravidas have been found in different parts of India. Of these four manuscripts are complete, collated and have been dated to 1662, 1665, 1676 and 1687. The first three are close with some morphological variants without affecting the meaning, but the 1687 version systematically inserts verses into the text, at various locations, with caste-related statements, new claims of Brahmins persecuting Ravidas, notes on the untouchability of Ravidas, claims of Kabir giving Ravidas ideas, ridicules of nirguni and saguni ideas, and such text corruption: Callewaert considers the 1676 version as the standard version, his critical edition of Ravidas's hagiography excludes all these insertions, and he remarks that the cleaner critical version of Anantadas's parcais suggests that there is more in common in the ideas of bhakti movement's Ravidas, Kabir and Sen than previously thought.

Khare similarly has questioned the textual sources on Ravidas, and mentions there are few "readily available and reliable textual sources on the Hindu and Untouchable treatment of Ravidas."

Literary works 
The Adi Granth and the Panchvani of the Hindu warrior-ascetic group Dadupanthi are the two oldest attested sources of the literary works of  Ravidas. In the Adi Granth, forty one of Ravidas's poems are included, and he is one of thirty six contributors to this foremost canonical scripture of Sikhism. This compilation of poetry in Adi Granth responds to, among other things, issues of dealing with conflict and tyranny, war and resolution, and willingness to dedicate one's life to the right cause. Ravidas's poetry covers topics such as the definition of a just state where there are no second or third class unequal citizens, the need for dispassion, and who is a real Yogi.

Jeffrey Ebbesen notes that, just like other Bhakti saint-poets of India and some cases of Western literature authorship, many poems composed by later era Indian poets have been attributed to Ravidas, as an act of reverence, even though Ravidas has had nothing to do with these poems or ideas expressed therein.

Ravidas literature on symbolism 
Peter Friedlander states that Ravidas' hagiographies, though authored long after he died, depict a struggle within the Indian society, where Ravidas' life gives the means to express a variety of social and spiritual themes. At one level, it depicts a struggle between the then prevalent heterodox communities and the orthodox Brahminical tradition. At another level, the legends are an inter-communal, inter-religious struggle with an underlying search and desire for social unity. At yet another level, states Friedlander, the stories describe the spiritual struggle of an individual unto self.

There is no historical evidence to verify the historicity in these hagiographies, which range from Ravidas's struggle with Hindu Brahmins, to his struggle with Muslim Sultan Sikander Lodi. Friedlander states that the stories reflect the social dynamics that influenced the composers of the hagiographies during the 17th- to 20th-century. These are legends where Ravidas is victorious because of divine intervention with miracles such as making a stone float in water, or making river Ganges to reverse course and flow upstream.

David Lorenzen similarly states that poetry attributed to Ravidas, and championed by Ravidasi from the 17th- through the 20th-century, have a strong anti-Brahminical and anti-communal theme. The legends, suggests Lorenzen, cannot be separated from the power and political situation of this era, and they reflect a strong element of social and religious dissent by groups marginalised during a period when Indian society was under the Islamic rule and later the colonial rule.

Philosophy 
The songs of Ravidas discuss Nirguna-Saguna themes, as well as ideas that are at the foundation of Nath Yoga philosophy of Hinduism. He frequently mentions the term Sahaj, a mystical state where there is a union of the truths of the many and the one.

David Lorenzen states Ravidas's poetry is imbued with themes of boundless loving devotion to God, wherein this divine is envisioned as Nirguna. In the Sikh tradition, the themes of Nanak's poetry are very broadly similar to the Nirgun bhakti ideas of Ravidas and other leading north Indian saint-poets. Most postmodern scholars, states Karen Pechilis, consider Ravidas's ideas to belong to the Nirguna philosophy within the Bhakti movement.

Monistic Brahman or Anthropomorphic God
Multiple manuscripts found in Rajasthan and Uttar Pradesh, dated to be from the 18th and 19th centuries, contain a theosophical debate between Kabir and Ravidas on the nature of the Absolute, more specifically whether the Brahman (Ultimate Reality, Eternal Truth) is monistic Oneness or a separate anthropomorphic incarnate. Kabir argues for the former. Ravidas, in contrast, argues from the latter premise to the effect that both are one. In these manuscripts, Kabir initially prevails, Ravidas accepts that Brahman is monistic, but till the end Kabir didn't accept worshipping a divine avatar (sagun conception).

One man: two divergent claims on his views and philosophy
Ravindra Khare states that there are two divergent versions that emerge from the study of texts relating to Ravidas's philosophy. The 17th century Bhaktamal text by Nabhadas provides one version, while the 20th-century texts by Dalits provide another.

According to Bhaktamal text, Ravidas was of pure speech, capable of resolving spiritual doubts of those who held discussions with him, was unafraid to state his humble origins and real caste. Further, the Bhaktamal text states that Ravidas's teachings agreed with Vedic and ancient scriptures, he subscribed to nondualism, discussed spiritual ideas and philosophy with everyone including Brahmins without gender or caste discrimination, and his abilities reflected an individual who had reached the inner content state of the highest ascetic.

The 20th-century version, prevalent in the texts of Dalit community, concurs with the parts about pure speech and resolving spiritual doubts. However, they differ in the rest. The texts and the prevalent beliefs of the Dalit community hold that Ravidas rejected the Hindu Vedas, he was opposed by the Brahmins and resisted by the caste Hindus as well as Hindu ascetics throughout his life, and that some members of the Dalit community have believed Ravidas was an idol worshipper (saguni bhakti saint) while other 20th century texts assert that Ravidas rejected idolatry. For example, the following hymn of Ravidas, present in Guru Granth Sahib, support such claims where he rejects Vedas and the belief that taking a ritualistic bath can make someone pure.

It has to be noted however, that his spiritual teacher Guru Ramananda was a Brahmin and his disciple Mirabai was a Rajput princess

Legacy

Ravidassia
The difference between the Ravidassia and Sikhism, as described by a post made by Shri Guru Ravidass Temple in Ontario is as follows: 
We, as Ravidassias have different traditions. We are not Sikhs. Even though, we give utmost respect to 10 gurus and Guru Granth Sahib, Guru Ravidass Ji is our supreme. There is no command for us to follow the declaration that there is no Guru after Guru Granth Sahib. We respect Guru Granth Sahib because it has our guru Ji's teachings and teachings of other religious figures who have spoken against caste system, spread the message of NAAM and equality. As per our traditions, we give utmost respect to contemporary gurus also who are carrying forward the message of Guru Ravidass Ji.The Ravidassia religion is a spin-off religion from Sikhism, formed in the 21st century, by the followers of Ravidas's teachings. It was formed following a 2009 attack on a Ravidassia temple in Vienna by Sikh radicals leading to the death of deputy head Ramanand Dass and 16 others injured, where after the movement declared itself to be a religion fully separated from Sikhism. The Ravidassia religion compiled a new holy book, Amritbani Guru Ravidass Ji. Based entirely on the writings and teaching of Ravidas, it contains 240 hymns. Niranjan Dass is the head of Dera Sachkhand Ballan.

Kathryn Lum summarises the dynamics behind the separation of Ravidassia and Sikhism, and its focus on Ravidas, as follows:

Places of worship

Ravidas is revered as a saint and well respected by his believers. He is considered by his devotees as someone who was the living symbol of religious protest, and not as the spiritual symbol of any ultimate unifying cultural principle.

Politics 

A political party was founded in India in 2012 by the followers of Ravidass, with the word Begumpura (Be-gam-pura, or "land without sorrow"), a term coined in a poem by Ravidas. The term means the city where there is no suffering or fear, and all are equal.

Guru Ravidas and Bhagtani Meera Bai 
There is a small chhatri (pavillion) in front of Meera's temple in Chittorgarh district of Rajasthan which bears Ravidas' engraved foot print. Legends link him as the guru of Mirabai, another major Bhakti movement poet.

Gallery

Art and Movie
• Sant Ravidas Ki Amar Kahani

See also 
 Sant Ravidas Ki Amar Kahani
 Gautama Buddha
 Dalit Buddhist movement
 Ramdasia Sikhs
 Kabir
 Kabir Jayanti
 Ravidassia
 Ravidas Jayanti
 Shri Guru Ravidas Gurughar

References

External links 
 Shri Guru Ravidas Ji

Vaishnava saints
Ravidassia
Indian Hindu spiritual teachers
Indian male poets
Sant Mat gurus
Year of birth unknown
Medieval Hindu religious leaders
Sikh Bhagats
15th-century Hindus
16th-century Hindus
15th-century Indian poets
16th-century Indian poets
Dalit saints
Scholars from Varanasi
Poets from Uttar Pradesh
Dalit Hindu saints